Desert Gold is a 1919 Australian horse racing melodrama from director Beaumont Smith starring the racehorse Desert Gold. It is considered to be a lost film.

Plot
John Forsythe and his trusty horse Desert Gold wander through the Australian outback, where Forsythe discovers a deposit of gold. A villain, Harrington, tries to steal Forsythe's claim, but is unsuccessful.

Years later, Forsythe owns substantial horse racing interests, which are run by trainer, Anderson, who has a daughter, Joan (Marie Ney). Forsythe has a new champion race horse, also known as Desert Gold (played by the real-life Desert Gold). Harrington knows his horse, Slippery Jane, has no chance against Desert Gold, so he plays Anderson at cards and gets him into debt. Joan discovers a wire across the training track set by Harrington's accomplices and manages to stop them hurting Desert Gold.

Harrington threatens to bankrupt Anderson so Joan offers to marry him. Forsythe ends up paying the debt and Joan is aged after a race between a motor car and a train to Katoomba. Harrington then lures Fortyhe to a lonely spot in the Blue Mountains and imprisons him, then sends a telegram in Forysthe's name scratching Desert Gold from the Cup and backs Slippery Jane. Forysthe manages to escape and flies to the city in time for the race. Desert Gold beats Slippery Jane, despite Harrington ordering an electric whip be used on his horse.

The film also features fights on horseback in the desert and on the brink of Leura Falls in the Blue Mountains, the blowing up of a ship at sea, and a flight of an aeroplane.

Cast
Marie Ney as Joan
John Cosgrove
Bryce Rowe
Gilbert Emery
Desert Gold as herself

Production
The film was shot in and around Sydney and at the air force base at Richmond, with desert scenes shot at Botany Bay. Desert Gold was a famous racehorse from the time and several leading jockeys have cameos. It was the film debut of actor Marie Ney who went on to have a significant career in Australian and England.

Release
The film's release was delayed due to the 1918 flu pandemic.

Variety said the film "was very crude in plot and acting and would be quite unsuitable for the American market."

Copies of the film were destroyed in a fire in 1925.

References

External links
Desert Gold in the Internet Movie Database
Desert Gold at National Film and Sound Archive

1919 films
Australian silent feature films
Films directed by Beaumont Smith
Australian black-and-white films
Lost Australian films
Australian drama films
1919 drama films
Melodrama films
1919 lost films
Lost drama films
Silent drama films